"Glorious"/"Precious Place" (stylized in all caps) is a single by Japanese singer-songwriter Rina Aiuchi. It was released on 29 March 2006 through Giza Studio, as the third single from her fifth studio album Delight. The double A-side single reached number five in Japan and has sold over 26,488 copies nationwide. Both songs served as the theme songs to the PlayStation 2 video game, Another Century's Episode 2.

Commercial performance
"Glorious"/"Precious Place" has sold over 26,488 copies and peaked at number five on the Oricon weekly singles chart, becoming her first single to reach top five since "Full Jump" in 2003.

Track listing

Charts

Certification and sales

|-
! scope="row"| Japan (RIAJ)
| 
| 26,488 
|-
|}

Release history

References

2006 singles
2006 songs
J-pop songs
Song recordings produced by Daiko Nagato
Songs written by Aika Ohno
Songs written by Miho Komatsu
Songs written by Rina Aiuchi
Video game theme songs